Thabo "Festival" Matlaba (born 13 December 1987) is a South African association football defender who most recently played for Premier Soccer League club Black Leopards now playing for Royal AM. He is known for his long range shots with both his feet. Although he plays mostly as a left back, Matlaba is naturally right-footed.

Career statistics

International career
He made his debut for South Africa on 14 May 2011 versus Tanzania in an international friendly.

Matlaba scored his first international goal with a  drive in a World Cup qualifier against the Central African Republic on 23 March 2013.

International goals
Scores and results list South Africa's goal tally first.

Style of play

He is well known for his excellent burst of outstanding overlapping pace, a versatile player or utility player

External links
 
 
 
 

1987 births
Living people
People from Tembisa
Association football defenders
South Africa international soccer players
South African soccer players
Free State Stars F.C. players
Black Leopards F.C. players
Orlando Pirates F.C. players
South African Premier Division players
2013 Africa Cup of Nations players
2015 Africa Cup of Nations players
Sportspeople from Gauteng